Peru competed at the 1984 Summer Olympics in Los Angeles, United States. 35 competitors, 19 men and 16 women, took part in 29 events in 10 sports.

Medalists

|style="text-align:left; width:74%; vertical-align:top;"|

|  style="text-align:left; width:26%; vertical-align:top;"|

Athletics

Men's 5,000 metres
 Roger Soler
 Heat — 14:28.26 (→ did not advance)

Women's Marathon
 Ena Guevara
 Final — 2:46:50 (→ 35th place)

Cycling

One cyclist represented Peru in 1984.

Individual road race
 Ramón Zavaleta — did not finish (→ no ranking)

Equestrianism

Judo

Rowing

Shooting

Mixed
A three-way tie for the medals was broken with a 25-target shoot-off. Luciano Giovannetti, the defending champion, won with a score of 24. Francisco Boza hit 23, while Daniel Carlisle hit 22.

Swimming

Men's 100m Freestyle
Fernando Rodríguez
 Heat — 54.61 (→ did not advance, 44th place)

Men's 100m Backstroke
Fernando Rodríguez
 Heat — 1:02.27 (→ did not advance, 34th place)

Alejandro Alvizuri
 Heat — 1:02.63 (→ did not advance, 35th place)

Men's 200m Backstroke
Alejandro Alvizuri
 Heat — 2:13.30 (→ did not advance, 30th place)

Men's 100m Breaststroke
Oscar Ortigosa
 Heat — 1:09.07 (→ did not advance, 41st place)

Men's 200m Breaststroke
Oscar Ortigosa
 Heat — 2:29.73 (→ did not advance, 33rd place)

Men's 200m Individual Medley
Fernando Rodríguez
 Heat — DSQ (→ did not advance, no ranking)

Women's 100m Freestyle
Sandra Crousse
 Heat — 1:01.02 (→ did not advance, 31st place)

Women's 200m Freestyle
Sandra Crousse
 Heat — 2:08.15 (→ did not advance, 22nd place)

Women's 200m Butterfly
Karin Brandes
 Heat — DNS (→ did not advance, no ranking)

Women's 200m Individual Medley
Karin Brandes
 Heat — 2:29.87 (→ did not advance, 24th place)

Women's 400m Individual Medley
Karin Brandes
 Heat — 5:11.92 (→ did not advance, 18th place)

Volleyball

Women's Team Competition

Peru women's volleyball team qualified for the Olympics by winning the 1983 Women's South American Volleyball Championship.

Team roster

Head coach: Park Man-Bok
<noinclude>

Group Play

Semifinal

Bronze medal match

Weightlifting

Wrestling

References

External links
Official Olympic Reports
International Olympic Committee results database

1984 in Peruvian sport
Nations at the 1984 Summer Olympics
1984